Bryan Charles Gould  (born 11 February 1939) is a New Zealand-born British former politician and diplomat. He served as a Member of Parliament (MP) from 1974 to 1979, and again from 1983 to 1994. He was a member of the Labour Party's Shadow Cabinet from 1986 to 1992, and stood unsuccessfully for the leadership of the party in 1992.

Gould returned to New Zealand and in 2004 was made a director at TVNZ.

Early life and family
Gould was born in Hāwera, New Zealand, on 11 February 1939, the son of Charles Terence Gould and Elsie Gladys May Gould (née Driller). He was educated at Tauranga College from 1951 to 1953, and then Dannevirke High School between 1954 and 1955. He went on to study at Victoria University College from 1956 to 1958, and Auckland University College from 1959 to 1962, graduating BA LLB in 1961, and LLM with first-class honours two years later. He was a New Zealand Rhodes Scholar to Balliol College, Oxford, from 1962. After completing a degree in Law with first-class honours, he joined the British Diplomatic Service in 1964. He then returned to Oxford as a tutorial Fellow in Law at Worcester College alongside Francis Reynolds.

Gould's brother is Wayne Gould, best known for popularising Sudoku. They are descendants of George Gould, a former chairman of the New Zealand Shipping Company. In 1967, Bryan Gould married Gillian Anne Harrigan, and the couple went on to have two children.

Parliamentary career
Having fought the seat unsuccessfully in February 1974, Gould was elected Labour MP for Southampton Test in October 1974 and held it until 1979. He worked as a television journalist from 1979 to 1983, and was then elected as MP for Dagenham from 1983, holding the seat until he resigned on 17 May 1994.

Gould was a member of Neil Kinnock's Shadow Cabinet, serving first as Shadow Chief Secretary to the Treasury, then as spokesman on Trade and Industry, the Environment, and later on Heritage. In 1992 he founded the Full Employment Forum. Later that year he was defeated in the leadership election to succeed Kinnock after the general election, which Labour had lost to the Conservative Party for the fourth election in succession. John Smith won the leadership contest, but Gould resigned from Smith's Shadow Cabinet on 27 September 1992 when the Shadow Cabinet rejected a referendum on the Maastricht Treaty and in protest against Labour's support for the European Exchange Rate Mechanism. He resigned his parliamentary seat in May 1994 when he was about to return to New Zealand.

After Parliament
In July 1994, Gould returned to New Zealand and became Vice-Chancellor of the University of Waikato, serving until his retirement in 2004. In this position, Gould was instrumental in initiating The Great Race, a rowing race for Waikato University against international universities on the Waikato River. The Bryan Gould Cup for the women's eights race is named after him.

In the 2005 Queen's Birthday Honours, Gould was appointed a Companion of the New Zealand Order of Merit, for services to tertiary education. In October 2006, he was awarded an honorary doctorate by the University of Waikato. He is a board member of TVNZ.

References

External links 

 
Bryan Gould's website
 
Gould on 100th anniversary of Labour Party, BBC

Labour Party (UK) MPs for English constituencies
Companions of the New Zealand Order of Merit
New Zealand emigrants to the United Kingdom
New Zealand Rhodes Scholars
UK MPs 1974–1979
UK MPs 1983–1987
UK MPs 1987–1992
UK MPs 1992–1997
1939 births
Living people
People from Hāwera
Alumni of Balliol College, Oxford
Members of HM Diplomatic Service
Fellows of Worcester College, Oxford
Academic staff of the University of Waikato
Chairs of the Fabian Society
People educated at Tauranga Boys' College
Victoria University of Wellington alumni
University of Auckland alumni
20th-century British diplomats